Kim Ji-woo (born Kim Jeong-eun on November 22, 1983) is a South Korean actress.

Filmography

Television series

Film

Variety show

Musical

Awards and nominations

References

External links

 
Kim Ji-woo at Daum 
Kim Ji-woo at Naver 

South Korean film actresses
South Korean television actresses
South Korean television personalities
Living people
1983 births
Actresses from Seoul
Dankook University alumni
21st-century South Korean actresses